Dongsu Station is a subway station on Line 1 of the Incheon Subway located at 686 Bupyeong-dong, 888 Gyeonginno Jiha, Bupyeong-gu, Incheon South Korea.

Station layout

Exits

References

Metro stations in Incheon
Seoul Metropolitan Subway stations
Railway stations in South Korea opened in 1999
Bupyeong District